Setra Systems, Inc. is an American electronics company. It is a manufacturer of electronic instruments that measure pressure, acceleration, and weight. The products designed and developed by Setra Systems, Inc. are used chiefly in the industrial manufacturing industry. Setra Systems Inc. was a fully owned subsidiary of Fortive.

History
Founded in 1967, Setra Systems, Inc. is a USA-based designer and manufacturer of pressure, humidity and current sensing products for the HVAC industry. In 2001, Setra was acquired by Danaher Corporation. Setra Technology Park is located in Boxborough, MA.[2] Setra's range of products also cater to agricultural, medical, and semi-conductor industries apart from the existing OEM, barometric, HVAC/R, environmental, test and measurement, food and pharmaceutical industries.

Management
The company was founded by Dr. Y. T. Li and Dr. S. Y. Lee, former professors of engineering at MIT. The founders are also the co–developers of the variable capacitance transduction principle, the force sensing technology which is the basis of Setra's products.

Products
Setra's range of products include differential pressure transmitters, low differential pressure transducer, wet-to-wet differential pressure transducer, gauge pressure transmitters, current switches and sensors, humidity sensors and vacuum sensors. The engineering and research efforts of Setra have been put into the development of transmitters and transducers designed using the variable capacitive transduction principle. Setra has applications in various industries such as OEM, barometric, HVAC/R, environmental, test and measurement, food and pharmaceutical industries and has now ventured into building automation, agricultural, medical and semi-conductor industries.

References

External links
 Setra Systems Official Website

Sensors
1967 establishments in the United States
Electronics companies established in 1967
Electronics companies of the United States
Manufacturing companies based in Massachusetts